This article may be expanded with text from WikiProject Volleyball:To do – biographies

Avital Haim Selinger (born 10 March 1959 in Haifa, Israel) is a retired volleyball player and head coach, who twice represented the Netherlands at the Summer Olympics of 1988 and 1992. He is the son of volleyball coach Arie Selinger.

After taking the command as head coach of the Swiss club Voléro Zürich in April 2015, he guided them to the bronze medal at the 2015 FIVB Club World Championship.

See also
 List of select Jewish volleyball players

References

1959 births
Living people
Dutch men's volleyball players
Israeli men's volleyball players
Israeli Jews
Israeli emigrants to the Netherlands
Dutch Jews
Dutch volleyball coaches
Israeli volleyball coaches 
Jewish Dutch sportspeople
Dutch expatriate sportspeople in Switzerland
Volleyball players at the 1988 Summer Olympics
Volleyball players at the 1992 Summer Olympics
Olympic volleyball players of the Netherlands
Jewish volleyball players
Olympic medalists in volleyball
Sportspeople from Haifa
Medalists at the 1992 Summer Olympics
Olympic silver medalists for the Netherlands
Volleyball coaches of international teams